Palash Kandi is a village in Pathakata Union of Nakla Upazila, Sherpur District, Bangladesh.

See also
 List of villages in Bangladesh

References

Populated places in Rangpur Division
Villages in Sherpur District
Villages in Mymensingh Division